Kostadin Georgiev (born 24 March 1986, in Burgas) is a Bulgarian footballer who plays as a goalkeeper.

Career
On 30 January 2014, Georgiev signed with Neftochimic Burgas as a free agent.

References

1986 births
Living people
Bulgarian footballers
First Professional Football League (Bulgaria) players
FC Chernomorets Burgas players
PFC Belasitsa Petrich players
Akademik Sofia players
PFC Spartak Varna players
Neftochimic Burgas players
Rayo Vallecano B players

Association football goalkeepers